Brachyglenis is a genus in the butterfly family Riodinidae present only in the Neotropical realm.

Species
Brachyglenis dinora (Bates, 1866) present in Nicaragua and Colombia
Brachyglenis dodone (Godman & Salvin, [1886]) present in Mexico and Panama
Brachyglenis drymo (Godman & Salvin, [1886]) present in Brazil
Brachyglenis esthema C. & R. Felder, 1862 present in Costa Rica, Colombia, Ecuador and Peru

Sources 
Brachyglenis sur funet
TOL

External links

Riodininae
Riodinidae of South America
Butterfly genera
Taxa named by Baron Cajetan von Felder
Taxa named by Rudolf Felder